HK Sāga Ķekava Riga was an ice hockey team in Riga, Latvia. They played in the Latvian Hockey League from 1991-1996.

History
The club was founded in 1991, and promptly won the first Latvian Hockey League title. They were not able to repeat this success, and their best finish was fifth place in the following season. After a 9th-place finish in the 1995-96 season, the club folded.

Season-by-season record

References

Ice hockey teams in Riga
Defunct ice hockey teams in Latvia
Latvian Hockey League teams